The Bridget Jones film series, consists of English romantic-comedies, based on the Helen Fielding authored novels of the same name. Starring Renée Zellweger in the titular role, with an ensemble supporting cast, the movies follow the life events of primary characters Bridget Jones, Mark Darcy, and Daniel Cleaver and explores their respective relationships.

The first film was a success at the box office, and was met with praise from critics. The second film received more mixed critical reception, but was commercially successful. The third film was met with both critical and commercial success. A fourth film was confirmed to be in active development in October 2022.

Films

Bridget Jones's Diary (2001) 

Bridget Jones is a binge drinking, chain smoking, and out of shape thirty-something British woman trying to keep her love life in order while also dealing with her job as a publisher. When she attends a Christmas party with her parents, they try to set her up with their neighbours' son, Mark. After being snubbed by Mark, she starts to fall for her boss Daniel, a handsome man who begins to send her suggestive e-mails that leads to a dinner date. Daniel reveals that he and Mark attended college together, in that time Mark had an affair with his fiancée. Bridget decides to get a new job as a TV presenter after finding Daniel being frisky with a colleague. At a dinner party, she runs into Mark who expresses his affection for her,  Daniel claims he wants Bridget back, the two fight over her and Bridget must make a decision who she wants to be with.

Bridget Jones: The Edge of Reason (2004) 

Bridget is currently living a happy life with her lawyer boyfriend Mark Darcy, however not only does she start to become threatened and jealous of Mark's new young intern, she is angered by the fact Mark is a conservative voter. With so many issues already at hand, things get worse for Bridget as her ex-lover, Daniel Cleaver, re-enters her life; the only help she has are her friends and her reliable diary.

Bridget Jones's Baby (2016) 

Bridget Jones is struggling with her current state of life, including her break up with her love Mark Darcy. As she pushes forward and works hard to find fulfilment in her life seems to do wonders until she meets a dashing and handsome American named Jack Quant. Things from then on go great, until she discovers that she is pregnant but the biggest twist of all, she does not know if Mark or Jack is the father of her child.

Bridget Jones: Mad About the Boy (TBA) 
In October 2022, Fielding told the Radio Times that a sequel was in the works, and the film would loosely adapt her 2013 novel Mad About the Boy.

Principal cast and characters

Additional crew and production details

Reception

Box office performance

Critical and public response

Accolades

Bridget Jones's Diary
Renée Zellweger was nominated for the Academy Award for Best Actress, the BAFTA Award for Best Actress in a Leading Role, the Broadcast Film Critics Association Award for Best Actress, the Empire Award for Best Actress, the Golden Globe Award for Best Actress – Motion Picture Musical or Comedy, the MTV Movie Award for Best Kiss (shared with Colin Firth), the Satellite Award for Best Actress – Motion Picture Musical or Comedy, the Screen Actors Guild Award for Outstanding Performance by a Female Actor in a Leading Role, the Teen Choice Award for Choice Chemistry (shared with Hugh Grant), the Teen Choice Award for Choice Liplock (shared with Grant), and the Dallas–Fort Worth Film Critics Association Award for Best Actress.

Firth won the European Film Awards Audience Award for Best Actor and the European Film Award – Jameson People's Choice Award – Best Actor and was nominated for the BAFTA Award for Best Actor in a Supporting Role and the Satellite Award for Best Actor – Motion Picture Musical or Comedy. Grant won the Evening Standard British Film Awards' Peter Sellers Award for Comedy and was nominated for the Empire Award for Best British Actor, the Satellite Award for Best Supporting Actor – Motion Picture Musical or Comedy, and the European Film Award – Jameson People's Choice Award – Best Actor. Richard Curtis, Andrew Davies, and Helen Fielding were nominated for the BAFTA Award for Best Adapted Screenplay. The film was nominated for the BAFTA Award for Best British Film, the Golden Globe Award for Best Motion Picture – Musical or Comedy, and the Satellite Award for Best Film – Musical or Comedy.

Bridget Jones: The Edge of Reason
The film was voted Evening Standard Readers' Film of 2004. It was on the shortlist for the Orange Film of the Year Award at the 2005 BAFTAs. For her performance as Bridget Jones, Zellweger gained another Golden Globe Award nomination and won the People's Choice Awards for Favorite Leading Lady in 2005.

Bridget Jones's Baby
The film was nominated at the 2017 Diversity in Media Awards for Movie of the Year and won the  ASPAC Award.

Home media
The first film on VHS was released in 2001 containing over 35 minutes of bonus material which includes: Deleted Scenes, Exclusive Interviews, Bridget's Guide to “Getting It Right”. There was also a VHS of "The Making of Bridget Jones". In 2001 the film was released on DVD containing brand new bonus material and in 2011 a Blu-ray version of the film was released. A Collective Edition of the film was released in 2004 with new bonus material including; The Bridget Phenomenon, The Young And The Mateless, Portrait Of The Makeup Artist, Domestic and International TV Spots, Bridget Jones: The Edge Of Reason Theatrical Trailer, Bridget Jones's Diary Reviews and A Guide to Bridget Britishism.

The second film was released on DVD in 2004 with a variety of bonus features.

Notes

References

 
Film series introduced in 2001